David Lowe (born 17 April 1955) is an English actor, composer, film director and scientist. He appeared in more than thirty films since 1987.

Selected filmography

References

External links

1955 births
Living people
English male film actors